Te Huia is a passenger train service between Hamilton, Papakura, and Auckland (Strand) in New Zealand. The service is a five-year trial with subsidies from the NZ Transport Agency and Waikato local authorities. The opening was delayed because of the COVID pandemic and the need to replace some rail track. A new starting date was announced, and the service began on 6 April 2021.

Initial proposals 
After the June 2006 announcement of the Overlander's cancellation, there were proposals to re-instate the Waikato Connection, including from Dave Macpherson, Hamilton City Council's Passenger Transport Committee chairman. The Overlander's cancellation was subsequently rescinded, eliminating the possibility of using its rolling stock on a new Waikato Connection, but other proposals have remained due to increased vehicular traffic volumes straining road capacity. These proposals include using the Silver Fern railcars as in the original Waikato Connection, though they were at the time under contract for suburban commuter trains between Auckland and Pukekohe. Proposals were floated in 2007 to reinstate the service. An interim proposal from the Rail Working Group in 2011 recommended further assessment of three options:
a) A Silver Fern railcar from Hamilton to Papakura with a transfer to the MAXX service at Papakura 
b) Extension of the MAXX service to Hamilton 
c) The composite train option (Silver Fern railcar coupled to the back of an existing MAXX service at Pukekohe).

This proposal addressed cost concerns raised by the affected local government organisations by making use of existing rolling stock and infrastructure where possible and avoiding use of the Britomart Transport Centre which, because of capacity constraints, was not available for peak-time arrivals and departures of such a service.

The proposal was dropped on a 2011 report in favour of extension only from Pukekohe to Tuakau, but that was also shelved. In 2016 the Transport Minister said, when starting work on a parallel section of Waikato Expressway costing over $2bn, "it will be some time before it makes its case economically".

A further study to establish a strategic business case was started in 2017. It identified the lack of a third line to Auckland and consequently, a journey time of over 2hrs 20mins as obstacles. Regional Council's 2018 Long Term Plan consultation also includes a question asking whether Hamilton ratepayers will pay about $11 a year for a skeleton commuter service from Hamilton to Papakura. A paper for the same plan proposes a Hamilton–Papakura bus link, taking 1hr 20mins, 10 minutes faster and much cheaper, at an estimated annual cost of $54,000.

Re-introduction of service 
The Sixth Labour Government promised commuter rail in 18 months to Hamilton and commuter rail to Hamilton and Tauranga. Hamilton residents want a passenger service right into Auckland (Britomart if possible). Labour MP Jamie Strange expected the service to be operating by the end of 2019. A 2018 Waikato Regional Council plan aimed to have more than 95% of peak rail trips completed in less than 2 hours and 30 minutes (compared with 50% by road) within 5 years, 2 hours within 15 years and eventually 90 minutes (90 km/h average).

In 2019, the unofficially popular name of Tron Express was announced and the start date further delayed to mid-2020. But Tron received fewest positive comments and was the least well liked in focus groups, so Te Huia was then recommended by two Waikato councils. In 2019, there was also discussion over the level of NZTA funding.

Detailed planning in 2018 put the start date back to March 2020. 
The delayed supply of new bogies from overseas delayed by two months the startup from March to May 2020. The service introduction was then delayed to November 2020 by the COVID-19 pandemic.

The need to replace some rail track in the Auckland area (including Papakura) where slow (40 km/h) speed limits would otherwise be required had meant that the likely start month has been put back to February 2021. It was later announced to begin April 6, 2021.

In November 2018, the proposed service from March 2020 was expected to take 91 minutes from Frankton to Papakura, stopping at Rotokauri and Huntly; and transferring at Papakura to another train to take 2 hours 29 minutes total to Britomart.

In 2018 KiwiRail planned that the service would run Monday to Friday (two trains) and Saturday (one train), with a running time of 88 minutes. between Hamilton railway station and Papakura railway station with stops at Rotokauri (a new station near The Base shopping mall on the outskirts of Hamilton and the site of the former Te Rapa railway station) and Huntly railway station (to be upgraded).

In late 2020, Waikato Regional Council published Te Huia's website. The new planned journey time was extended to 98 minutes (Frankton to Papakura), with intermediate stops at Rotokauri and Huntly. The fares are Adult $12.20 (Hamilton Stations-Papakura) with a Bee Card, or $17 without. Cheaper or Free fares are available for Children, Students, SuperGold (Saturdays), and Accessibility. From 12 July the Hamilton-Papakura fares are $12 with a card and $20 without and the same fares apply to Saturday services to Strand.

Patronage 
On the first day up to 106 passengers were on the trains, but for the rest of the first week of operation passenger numbers on each train ranged between 12 and 48, with the earlier trains generally more popular than the later. On the first Saturday, passengers were standing and others were unable to join at Huntly. Average daily loadings in the first seven weeks were 153, 118, 222, 287, 123, 130 and 149. Saturday services were still close to seated capacity in July, when extension to Strand allowed capacity to be doubled. After another lockdown, trains ran from 24 January to 28 February 2022 with an average of 83 passengers on weekdays and 60 on Saturdays. Te Huia has suffered from a decline, like other public transport, due to COVID-19. Late running was also a problem in early 2022, with 47 trains on-time and 32 late, due to speed restrictions, heat speed restrictions and delays in track tamping work.

The new schedule and extension to the Strand have increased patronage significantly with record numbers in April 2022, an average of 265 passengers a day. - an average of 240 passengers on weekdays and 353 on Saturdays.

Timings and average speeds 

Criticism has been made of the slow journey and paucity of intermediate stops.

In 2018 an indicative timetable was published. As shown in the table below, timings were eased between the 2018 plan and the actual timetable. The first train arrived 4 minutes early at Papakura, but a car, leaving Hamilton at the same time, arrived at Britomart 35 minutes earlier.

The only competing public transport service is by InterCity bus. The 17:45 bus is 32 minutes faster than the train:-

The average speeds of the morning trains and the differences between the indicative and current (2021) timetables are:-

On 9 July 2021 it was announced that the Saturday service would from then on run to Strand

According to Te Huia's website, AT services to Britomart depart Papakura approximately every 10 minutes (at peak times), the goal is to have a transfer window of 7–11 minutes.

Trains were suspended from August 2021 to January 2022 due to COVID-19 lockdowns. The revised timetable from 24 January 2022 reduces the commuter services to a single train, extended to Strand, but allows day trips from Auckland:-

Past comparisons 

The fastest times for trains on the route have been -

Rolling stock 

Te Huia uses two consists of four refurbished SA and SD carriages, each with capacity for 147 commuters and a café car. The refurbished (by Hutt Workshops) former Auckland Transport SA and SD cars (ten SA and three SD, which became redundant in 2015) have been refitted into KiwiRail SR class.

The two consists have two SR, one SRC and one SRV carriages; with an overall capacity of 300 passengers each way daily. This could increase to two five-carriage consists with a capacity of 400 passengers each way daily.

The three carriage designs are: 
SR carriage: 50 seats & WC
SRC carriage: 20 seats & facilities (servery) & accessible (wheel-chair) WC. 
 SRV carriage: 28 seats & 10 flip-up seats, facility for cycles, generator room, staff office (also a driving cab, though this may be impractical for long-distance work and only used at each end of the journey).

Te Huia sets as delivered from Hutt workshops:

1st set: SRV5893, SR5847, SR6061 & SRC5889 
2nd set: SRV5993, SR3285, SR5801 & SRC3436 
3rd set: SRV5859, SR5746, SR6015 & SRC5994

The carriages retain the modern metro-style doors from their former Auckland Transport SA and SD class days, which are easier for wheelchair users and cyclists to use, so do not have the wide windows as fitted to the Wairarapa Connection carriages which have traditional “quarter” doors (this slightly reduces the number of seats, but the cost of door conversion was prohibitive). Carriages are painted with a livery consisting largely of gloss grey, with a depiction of the extinct huia bird.

The service uses overhauled DFB locomotives (two operating and one spare). The empty trains run to Otahuhu railway station and the Westfield sidings during the day, and will be serviced at a carriage depot at the Rotokauri station (Te Rapa) at night.

In 2022 weekday services were extended through to The Strand Station, following resumption of services after the 2021 COVID lockdown and engineering works on the Auckland tracks.

Future 
ATAP, Auckland's 2018–2028 plan provided for Pukekohe electrification, a third line from Westfield to Wiri and further new electric trains, part of up to $205m a year proposed by government for "transitional rail" spending, which may include a Hamilton service.

In 2019, the New Zealand government approved a review into upgrading the rail line to accommodate a maximum speed of 160 km/h, which would halve the journey times between Auckland and Hamilton. Also in 2019, a group made up of local councils and the Ministry of Transport issued a 'Shared Statement of Spatial Intent'. It envisages that suburban electric services may extend to Pokeno within 10 years and that, beyond that, the whole route would be electrified and faster alignments be created via the Bombay Hills, around the Whangamarino wetland and east of Huntly. It also suggests a spur to Hamilton Airport.

An interim business case released by the minister in August 2020 said that "Rapid Rail" could cost between $2.2 billion and $14.4 billion, and said there was a strong case for further investigation. Electrifying the present rail corridor would cost an estimated $2.157 billion with additional operating costs of $725 million, having trains travelling at up to 110 km/h with a travel time between the two centres of 1 hour and 53 minutes. A new standard gauge corridor would cost $14.425 billion; having trains travelling at 250 km/h and taking 69 minutes.

There were two intermediate options, with trains travelling at 160 km/h and taking 1 hour 28 minutes, or at 110 km/h in 1 hour 41 minutes. Previous options included "Tilt Trains".

KiwiRail, operator of Te Huia and the Capital Connection, states that support from local government and central government is critical for any inter-regional passenger services.

References

External links 

 Photos of the coaches being refurbished in 2020:  
 Te Huia Website
 Te Huia on Facebook
 Te Huia on Instagram

Long-distance passenger trains in New Zealand
Rail transport in Waikato
Rail transport in the Auckland Region
Railway services introduced in 2021